Enzo Carli may refer to:
Enzo Carli (art historian)
Enzo Carli (photographer)